Grace Episcopal Church is a historic Episcopal church at 116 City Island Avenue in The Bronx, New York, New York. The church was built in 1862 in the Carpenter Gothic style, and the rectory was built around that year in the Italian Villa style.

The complex was added to the National Register of Historic Places in 2006.

References

External links 
Official website

Episcopal church buildings in the Bronx
Properties of religious function on the National Register of Historic Places in the Bronx
Carpenter Gothic church buildings in New York City
Italianate architecture in New York City
Churches completed in 1862
19th-century Episcopal church buildings
1862 establishments in New York (state)

City Island, Bronx
Italianate church buildings in the United States